The 1942 NCAA basketball tournament involved eight schools playing in single-elimination play to determine the national champion of men's NCAA Division I college basketball. It began on March 20, 1942, and ended with the championship game on March 28 in Kansas City, Missouri. A total of nine games were played, including a third place game in each region.

Stanford, coached by Everett Dean, won the national title with a 53–38 victory in the final game over Dartmouth, coached by O. B. Cowles. Howie Dallmar of Stanford was named the tournament's Most Outstanding Player. The Indians' success, however, was not to last, as they would not make the tournament again for 47 years, which is currently tied for the eighth-longest drought in NCAA tournament history. 

Everett Dean is the only coach to have never lost an NCAA tournament game. Dean was 3–0 in his lone appearance.

Colorado, Dartmouth, Kansas and Rice became the first teams to appear in multiple NCAA Tournaments by appearing in the 1942 tournament.

Locations
The following were the sites selected to host each round of the 1942 tournament:

Regionals

March 20 and 21
East Regional, Tulane Gym, New Orleans, Louisiana
West Regional, Municipal Auditorium, Kansas City, Missouri

Championship Game

March 28
Municipal Auditorium, Kansas City, Missouri

For the third straight year, the Municipal Auditorium hosted both the West regionals and the championship game, making it one of two cities (along with its successor, New York City) to host more than two years in a row. For the fourth straight year, the East Regional was held on a college campus, this time on the campus of Tulane University in New Orleans. This would be the only time prior to the construction of the Louisiana Superdome that the tournament would be held in the Crescent City, now a regular tournament site.

Teams

Bracket

Regional third place

See also
 1942 NAIA Basketball Tournament
 1942 National Invitation Tournament

References

NCAA Division I men's basketball tournament
Ncaa
NCAA Division I men's basketball tournament